These are the Billboard magazine number-one albums of 1980, per the Billboard 200.

Chart history

See also
1980 in music
List of number-one albums (United States)

References

1980
1980 record charts